Pawuththuwadura Milton (born 27 June 1966) is a Sri Lankan former first-class cricketer who played for Antonians Sports Club and Singha Sports Club.

References

External links
 

1966 births
Living people
Sri Lankan cricketers
Antonians Sports Club cricketers
Singha Sports Club cricketers
People from Ambalangoda